This is a list of television stations in East Asia.

China

China Central Television
China Education Television
China Weather TV
China Xinhua News Network Corporation 
China Global Television Network

Hong Kong

Fantastic Television Limited
HK Television Entertainment
Radio Television Hong Kong
Television Broadcasts Limited
ViuTV

Japan 

Animax
BS
Fuji TV
J Sports
NHK
NTV
Open University
Star Channel
TBS 
Tokyo TV
TV Asahi
TV Tokyo

Macau 

Lotus TV Macau
Macau Asia Satellite Television
Teledifusão de Macau

Mongolia
C1
Channel 25 (Mongolia)
Dish TV
Eagle TV
Edutainment TV
Mongolian News Channel
NTV
Sportbox
Supervision Broadcasting Network
TM Television
TV5 (Mongolia)
TV8 (Mongolia)
TV9 (Mongolia)
Ulaanbaatar Broadcasting System

North Korea

Korean Central Television
Mansudae Television

South Korea

 Educational Broadcasting System
 Korean Broadcasting System
 Munhwa Broadcasting Corporation
 Seoul Broadcasting System

Taiwan

 Formosa Television
 Hakka Television Station
 Public Television Service
 Taiwan Television

See also

 Lists of television channels
 List of television stations in Central Asia
 List of television stations in Southeast Asia
 List of television stations in Western Asia

References

Asia-related lists
East Asia
Television stations|East Asia